Oolkatal or Ulkadal is a 1979 Malayalam-language musical-romantic drama film directed by K. G. George and starring Venu Nagavally and Sobha. The film, considered to be the first campus film in Malayalam, was adapted from the novel of the same name by George Onakkoor. It was shot mainly from Mar Ivanios College, Trivandrum.

Plot 

The film's protagonist is Rahulan who loves three different women in different stages of his life. After his childhood love Thulasi commits suicide, Rahulan falls in love with his friend's sister Reena. She hails from an orthodox Christian family and Rahulan never has the courage to approach her father for a marriage proposal. After completing college, Rahulan gets a teacher job. He eventually falls in love with Meera, a rich student of his. Meera's family fixes her marriage with Rahulan. One night, Reena visits Rahulan in his house and at the same time Meera and her father also come and is shocked to see another woman with Rahulan. In the climax, Rahulan accepts Reena into his life. On the parallel, another romance story is also told, between Davis (Rahulan's friend and Reena's brother), and a nun.

Cast 

 Venu Nagavally as Rahulan
 Sobha as Reena
 Suchitra as Meera
 Anuradha as Thulasi
 Ratheesh as Davis
 Jalaja as Susanna
 Jagathy Sreekumar as Shanku
 Sankaradi as Father Chenadan
 P. K. Venukuttan Nair as Reena's father
 Kumudam
 Azeez as Meera's father
 Dr. Namputhiri
 Konniyoor Vijayakumar
 William Dicruz
 Thilakan as Rahulan's father
 Sreemathi George Varghese
 Thrissur Elsy as Meera's mother
 Omanammal
 Jessy
 Shanthi
 Nicemon as child rahulan

Soundtrack 
The music was composed by M. B. Sreenivasan with lyrics by O. N. V. Kurup.

References

External links 
 
 

1970s Malayalam-language films
1970s romantic musical films
1979 films
1979 romantic drama films
Films based on Indian novels
Films directed by K. G. George
Films scored by M. B. Sreenivasan
Films shot in Thiruvananthapuram
Indian romantic drama films
Indian romantic musical films